The following is a list of all team-to-team transactions that have occurred in the National Hockey League during the 2007–08 NHL season.  It lists what team each player has been traded to, signed by, or claimed by, and for which players or draft picks, if applicable.

Free agency

June

July

August

September

October

November

December

January

February

May/June

See also
2007–08 NHL season
2007 NHL Entry Draft
2007 in sports
2008 in sports
2006–07 NHL transactions
2008–09 NHL transactions

References
 tsn.ca Free Agent signings
 The Hockey News Transaction log
 sportsnet.ca Free Agent signings
 nhl.com Free Agent signings
 espn.com transactions

transactions
National Hockey League transactions